Euleechia pratti is a moth of the family Erebidae. It was described by John Henry Leech in 1890. It is found in the Chinese provinces of Sichuan, Zhejiang, Jiangxi, Hubei and Yunnan.

References

Callimorphina
Moths described in 1890